The Djibouti national football team is the association football team of Djibouti. It is controlled by the Djiboutian Football Federation, and is a member of the Confederation of African Football (CAF) and the Union of Arab Football Associations (UAFA).

Results

See also
Football in Djibouti
Djiboutian Football Federation
Djibouti Premier League
Djibouti Cup
Stade du Ville

References

Djibouti - List of International Matches
Djibouti at FIFA

Djibouti national football team